Such a Fun Age is a 2019 novel by American author Kiley Reid. It is her debut novel and was published by G. P. Putnam's Sons on December 31, 2019. It tells the story of a young Black woman who is wrongly accused of kidnapping while babysitting a white child, and the events that follow the incident. The novel received favorable reviews and was longlisted for the 2020 Booker Prize.

Plot
Alix Chamberlain is a wealthy blogger and public speaker in her early thirties who has built a brand known as "LetHer Speak" around the practice of writing old-fashioned letters to businesses, often in exchange for free product samples, and encouraging women to be assertive. Alix's family has moved from New York City to her hometown of Philadelphia for her husband Peter's job as a television anchor, and her career is stalling as she raises two children and attempts to write her first book. Alix hires Emira Tucker, a 25-year-old African-American college graduate, as a babysitter to care for her three-year-old daughter Briar. Alix also has an infant daughter named Catherine.

Alix and Peter's home is egged at night and a window is broken after Peter received backlash for making a racist remark on-air, though he insists the comment was thoughtless. Alix calls Emira, who is at a party with friends, to take Briar with her to a local, trendy supermarket while she and Peter speak with the police. At the store, Emira, her friend Zara, and Briar dance to Whitney Houston and are noticed by an older white woman. After Zara leaves, a security guard approaches Emira at the white woman's behest and questions why Emira is with Briar. Emira explains the situation but the guard refuses to believe she is a babysitter, and Emira is freed only once Peter shows up and corroborates her story. The incident is recorded by a white bystander, Kelley Copeland, who urges Emira to seek justice against the store. Emira is shaken but does not want attention; she has him email the video to her and delete it from his phone.

Alix is shocked by the incident and tries to treat Emira better, offering her extra pay and gifts, and becomes intent on developing a friendship with her, though Emira simply regards Alix as her employer. Meanwhile, Emira runs into Kelley again on the train, and the two start dating. For Thanksgiving, Alix invites Emira and her boyfriend to the Chamberlain home. Upon meeting, they realize that Alix (formerly Alex Murphy) and Kelley dated at in high school and parted on bad terms. Later, Kelley tells Emira that she needs to quit her job because Alix is racist: in high school she called the police to a party at her mansion home, indirectly caused a Black student, Robbie, to lose his scholarship when he was arrested with drugs, and has a history of surrounding herself with black employees. Emira, feeling Kelley is being inconsiderate of her anxiety about her employment status and lack of professional career, refuses to quit.

Alix tells Emira that she should break up with Kelley because he fetishized black people in high school: he invited Robbie and the cool kids to the house to become friends with them and later broke up with Alix in favor of them. When Emira dismisses her advice, Alix gains access to Emira's email and leaks the video of the grocery store incident. To Emira's shock, it goes viral. Believing that Kelley leaked it, she breaks up with him. Alix comforts her and offers her a full-time job as Briar's nanny, which she accepts. Alix also arranges an interview with Emira and herself on local television.

Minutes before the interview, Emira learns that it was in fact Alix who leaked the video. On air, Emira embarrasses Alix by quitting and using the same line that Kelley had used to break up with her in high school. When Alix confronts her, Emira urges Alix to be a better mother to Briar. After the interview airs, Kelley tries to contact Emira but she does not respond.

Years pass and Emira begins working as administrative assistant. She sees Kelley with his black girlfriend and Mrs. Chamberlain with an older Briar but does not approach any of them. Well into her thirties, Emira wonders what she learned from her time at the Chamberlain house and what kind of person Briar will grow up to become.

Themes
Such a Fun Age deals with themes of interracial relations, privilege, millennial anxiety, and wealth.
Reid  tropes of the white savior and unknowing racist as they play out in everyday life. Throughout the novel, the white characters assume they know what is best for the protagonist, without ever seeing anything from her perspective, and speak about her with a sense of ownership. The novel satirizes what has been described as "the white pursuit of wokeness", by having the two main white characters use their relationships with Emira as the battleground through which each intends to prove their racial virtue. Reid explained that she did not think of her characters as inherently bad, conversely, that they "were dying to help, but kind of going through mental gymnastics to ignore the broken systems that put people where they are to begin with."

The novel also deals with millennial anxiety relating to job security and confusion over career choices. Over the course of the book, Emira's main concern is to find a secure job, as she will be removed from her parents' healthcare insurance cover upon turning 26. While she remains at her babysitting job, her group of friends start advancing in their careers, intensifying her desire for "a real adult job", which neither she nor her friends consider babysitting to be. In the context of Emira's job, the novel also explores emotional labour and transactional relationships. Reid stated in an interview that "the history of black women taking care of white children is at the forefront [of the book]. It's this job that is so important, with really high stakes and a very small margin of error—but also, a 13-year-old could do it."

Background
Reid started writing the novel in 2015, while she was applying to graduate school, and finished it while pursuing her MFA at the University of Iowa. It was during this period that the deaths of Freddie Gray and Philando Castile took place, and Reid said she was "absolutely inspired by the everyday terror" but that, in the novel, she wanted to explore "instances of racial biases that don't end in violence as a way of highlighting those moments that we don't see on the news but still exist every day." Reid has also said that the novel was partly inspired by the years she spent in her 20s working as a babysitter.

The novel was published in the United States in hardcover and paperback by G. P. Putnam's Sons on December 31, 2019. It was published in the United Kingdom in hardcover by Bloomsbury Circus, an imprint of Bloomsbury Publishing, on January 7, 2020.

Reception
The novel was very well received by critics, who described it as having timely themes, authentic dialogue and believable characters. Sara Collins of The Guardian gave the novel a rave review, calling it "the calling card of a virtuoso talent" and writing that it "skillfully interweaves race-related explorations with astute musings on friendship, motherhood, marriage, love and more." The novel also received praise from Kirkus Reviews and Publishers Weekly, with the latter describing it as a "nuanced portrait of a young black woman struggling to define herself apart from the white people in her life who are all too ready to speak and act on her behalf."

Hephzibah Anderson of The Observer criticized the character development of Alix Chamberlain as well as the novel's plot for "[pivoting] on an almighty coincidence" but nonetheless called it a "cracking debut" and wrote that "Reid writes with a confidence and verve that produce magnetic prose." The Boston Globe concurred, noting that the second half of the novel was based on a "contrived" coincidence but "once you buy into the path Reid chooses, she deftly ratchets up the tension and the characters always ring true."

Lauren Christensen of The New York Times Book Review gave the novel a mixed review, criticizing the plot's "many lapses in credibility" as well as Reid's "cloying vernacular".

The novel debuted at number three on The New York Times Hardcover Fiction best-sellers list.

Awards and honors

References

2019 American novels
2019 debut novels
G. P. Putnam's Sons books
African-American novels
Novels set in Philadelphia
Novels about child care occupations
Novels set in the 2010s
Fiction set in 2015
Literature by African-American women